Pamphil Rabefitia (born 27 March 1986 in Antananarivo) is a football player who last played for SS Jeanne d'Arc in the Réunion Premier League and use to play for the Madagascar national football team as a forward. Rabefitia made his debut against Botswana at the 2006 COSAFA Cup where he hit the cross bar,

References 

1986 births
Living people
Madagascar international footballers
Malagasy footballers
Malagasy expatriate footballers
Expatriate footballers in Réunion
Expatriate footballers in Mauritius
La Tamponnaise players
People from Antananarivo
Association football forwards
USJF Ravinala players
AS Adema players
AS Marsouins players
US Sainte-Marienne players
Malagasy expatriate sportspeople in Mauritius
Malagasy expatriate sportspeople in Réunion